Neophylax is a genus of autumn mottled sedges in the family Uenoidae. There are more than 30 described species in Neophylax.

Species
These 37 species belong to the genus Neophylax:

 Neophylax acutus Vineyard & Wiggins, 1987
 Neophylax albipunctatus (Martynov, 1930)
 Neophylax aniqua Ross, 1947
 Neophylax atlanta Ross, 1947
 Neophylax auris Vineyard & Wiggins, 1987
 Neophylax ayanus Ross, 1938
 Neophylax concinnus McLachlan, 1871
 Neophylax consimilis Betten, 1934
 Neophylax delicatus Banks, 1943
 Neophylax etnieri Vineyard & Wiggins, 1987
 Neophylax fenestratus (Banks, 1940)
 Neophylax fuscus Banks, 1903
 Neophylax japonicus Schmid, 1964
 Neophylax kolodskii Parker, 2000 (Kolodski's caddisfly)
 Neophylax lewisae Etnier
 Neophylax maculatus (Forsslund, 1935)
 Neophylax mitchelli Carpenter, 1933
 Neophylax muinensis Kobayashi, 1977
 Neophylax nacatus Denning, 1941
 Neophylax nigripunctatus Tian & Li Tian, Li, Yang & Sun, in Chen, editor, 1993
 Neophylax occidentis Banks, 1924
 Neophylax oligius Ross, 1938 (autumn sedge)
 Neophylax ornatus Banks, 1920
 Neophylax ottawa Vineyard & Wiggins, 1987
 Neophylax relictus (Martynov, 1935)
 Neophylax rickeri Milne, 1935
 Neophylax securis Vineyard & Wiggins, 1987
 Neophylax sinuatus Navas, 1917
 Neophylax slossonae Banks, 1943
 Neophylax smithi Vineyard & Wiggins, 1987
 Neophylax splendens Denning, 1948
 Neophylax stolus Ross, 1938
 Neophylax tenuicornis (Ulmer, 1907)
 Neophylax toshioi Vineyard & Wiggins, 1987
 Neophylax ussuriensis (Martynov, 1914)
 Neophylax virginica Flint & Kjer
 Neophylax wigginsi Sykora & Weaver, 1978

References

Further reading

External links

 

Trichoptera genera
Articles created by Qbugbot
Integripalpia